Sultan, one of the brightest of the early chimpanzees used for psychological research, was tested by Gestalt psychologist Wolfgang Köhler.  Sultan is particularly recognized for his insight in solving numerous problems, including stacking or manipulating boxes to reach a reward and use of two sticks as a unit to rake food to a reachable distance.

While other Chimpanzees in Köhler's study were also quite adept at problemsolving—namely, obtaining an out-of-reach fruit suspended above a playground or perched just beyond arm's reach outside the bars of a cage—Sultan proved to be peculiarly advanced.  He and his peers were also known to stack crates to reach the fruit, and even scramble up a hastily balanced stick to grab the banana before falling back down.

Chimpanzees helped Köhler to prove that animals are capable of learning beyond simple trial and error, and that, given the right conditions, many species—particularly the more "human" species of primates—will demonstrate a deeper understanding of the constituents of a problem.  For example, several chimpanzees who had proven capable of reaching the banana via a stack of crates found that in a crateless room, a table or chair worked to meet the same end.

See also
 List of individual apes

References

Individual chimpanzees